María Moreño (born 4 December 1952) is a Salvadoran former swimmer. She competed in five events at the 1968 Summer Olympics.

References

External links
 

1952 births
Living people
Salvadoran female swimmers
Olympic swimmers of El Salvador
Swimmers at the 1968 Summer Olympics
Sportspeople from San Salvador
20th-century Salvadoran women